Mayaro–Rio Claro is a region of Trinidad. The local government body is Mayaro–Rio Claro Regional Corporation, a Regional Corporation of Trinidad and Tobago. The Mayaro–Rio Claro Regional Corporation is headquartered in Rio Claro. Other towns include Mayaro.

The region possesses many beach front properties and Trinidad's largest reservoir of natural gas and crude oil along its eastern coast. It includes the Ortoire Block, an  resource exploration area where Trinidad's largest onshore natural gas discovery was found in the Ortoire syncline.

Mayaro–Rio Claro Regional Corporation 
The Corporation's area of responsibility comprises 39 discrete communities. It has the second largest landmass of any Regional Corporation in Trinidad. The Regional Corporation is governed by the Municipal Corporation's Act No. 8 of 1992 and is one of fourteen such bodies under the Ministry of Local Government. Two of the 41 Trinidadian electoral districts are located in Mayaro–Rio Claro: Mayaro and Moruga/Tableland.

References

Sources 
 Local Government Corporations, from Nalis, the National Library and Information Service of Trinidad and Tobago.
 Mayaro Rio Claro Corporation Website, from Mayaro Rio Claro Corporation Information Services

Regions of Trinidad and Tobago
Rio Claro, Trinidad and Tobago